Les Rousses is a commune in the Canton of Hauts de Bienne of Jura department in the Bourgogne-Franche-Comté region in eastern France, on the Swiss border.

The Lac des Rousses is located northeast of the village of Les Rousses beside the road to the village of Bois d'Amont. The Lac de Lamoura is located southwest of the village of Les Rousses beside the road to the village of Lamoura. Other places include the village of Prémanon, and La Cure, the transit point across the Swiss border towards Saint-Cergue.

Population

Tourism
Les Rousses includes part of the Upper Jura Natural Park and Fort des Rousses (fr), an historical fortress that, until 1997, was used as a commando training site. The fortress includes an underground labyrinth used in training, that is open to the public.

Les Rousses has an extensive ski area, especially for cross-country skiing. Many villages have their own runs using a common lift pass.
 Alpine
 Massif du Noirmont
 Massif des Tuffes
 Porte des Jouvencelles
 Porte de la Darbella
 Porte de la Serra
 Porte de la Combe de lac
 Porte de la Giraude
 Nordic
 Secteur de Bellefontaine
 Secteur du Risoux
 Secteur de  l'Orbe
 Secteur de la Sambine
 Secteur du Massacre
 Secteur de Longchamois
 Secteur de Lamoura/Serra

See also
Communes of the Jura department

References

External links
 Les Rousses Ski info

 
Communes of Jura (department)